José Antonio Offerman Dono (born November 8, 1968) is a Dominican retired professional baseball player who played professional baseball for nearly 20 years. He played for 15 seasons in Major League Baseball and played four seasons of independent and Mexican League baseball after leaving MLB.

He most recently managed the Licey Tigers of the Dominican Winter League, leading them to the 2008–2009, 2013–2014 and 2022-2023 Dominican Winter League Championship. During a baseball game on January 16, 2010, Offerman attacked an umpire during an argument and, as a result, was banned from the Winter League for three years. He managed the Rojos del Águila de Veracruz of the Mexican League in 2014.

Early career
After attending Colegio Biblico Cristiano High School in San Pedro de Macorís, Offerman signed with the Los Angeles Dodgers as an amateur free agent in 1986. In , he completed his first season of professional play being named as Best Prospect in the Pioneer League. Progressing rapidly through the minor leagues, he made his major league debut against the Montreal Expos on August 19, becoming the 55th player in major league history to hit a home run in his first major league at-bat.

Major leagues
By , Offerman became the Dodgers' starting shortstop. On opening day 1993, he was the first batter to ever face the Florida Marlins, striking out against Charlie Hough. He made his first appearance in the All-Star Game in 1995 but was traded to the Kansas City Royals after the season, mostly because of his very poor defense. After a year as a utility player, he won the starting second baseman job in 1997. After that season, he signed with the Boston Red Sox as a free agent, making the All-Star Game for the second time in 1999.

Offerman was a more productive hitter than fielder; in 1992, 1993 and 1995, he committed 42, 37 and 35 errors respectively. He was sent to the Seattle Mariners during the  season, but was released afterwards. In , he joined the Montreal Expos in spring training but was cut before the regular season began. He spent the entire year with the Bridgeport Bluefish of the independent Atlantic League. In , he won a spot on the Minnesota Twins roster and led the league in pinch-hits with 12 in 29 attempts. He started  with the Philadelphia Phillies but was released after a slow start. Later, he signed with the New York Mets and was called back up to the majors in June.

Post-USA major leagues
Most recently, Offerman played in the 2008 Caribbean World Series for the Licey Tigers – Dominican Republic 2 team – where he assisted the team in winning its 10th Caribbean World Series title.  During the series he signed a contract with the 2008 Veracruz Red Eagles of the Mexican Summer League.

In December, 2008, Offerman was named player-manager of Licey Tigers of the Dominican Winter League.  With Offerman as manager, Licey swept the Dominican Winter League Baseball Championships, winning five straight against the Gigantes del Cibao.  As champions, Licey was then invited to participate in the 2009 Caribbean World Series with Offerman as manager (the series was ultimately won by Venezuela). (The Caribbean World Series is affiliated with the Winter League programs of Major League Baseball, featuring MLB players and prospects from the Dominican Winter League, Mexican Pacific League, Puerto Rican Professional Baseball League and Venezuelan Professional Baseball League.)

On January 7, 2014, Offerman was again named manager of the Licey Tigers of the Dominican Winter League, replacing Mike Guerrero.  With Offerman at the helm, Licey won the Dominican Winter League Baseball Championships, winning five games to three over the Leones del Escogido.  As champions again, Licey has been invited to the 2014 Caribbean World Series with Offerman as manager.  At present, his team has qualified for the semifinals of the tournament.

Bat incident
He has not played or managed professional baseball in the United States since 2007. On August 14, 2007, while playing for the Long Island Ducks of the Atlantic League of Professional Baseball, Offerman was thrown out of a game against the Bridgeport Bluefish for charging Bluefish pitcher Matt Beech with a bat after he was hit by a pitch. Beech sustained a broken finger in the resulting melee. Bluefish catcher John Nathans was also hit in the back of the head during the bench-clearing melee, receiving a severe concussion that effectively ended his playing career. Beech and Nathans were taken to Bridgeport Hospital where they were treated and released.  After being removed from the game, Offerman was arrested by the Bridgeport Police.

On August 15, 2007, he was suspended indefinitely. The independent Atlantic League announced on August 17, 2007, that Offerman would remain suspended at least until the legal case was resolved.

On September 24, 2007, Offerman pleaded not guilty to two second degree assault charges.

His case was pending in Bridgeport Superior Court GA#2 in Bridgeport, Connecticut.  He was represented by Attorney Frank J. Riccio II.  On October 30, 2007, Offerman was given two years special probation called "Accelerated Rehabilitation ('AR')."  The Court determined that his actions on August 14, 2007, were of an aberrant nature.  The Court also found that Offerman is not likely to offend again in the future.

Nathans filed a $4.8 million civil suit against Offerman in February 2009, alleging that he still has post-concussion syndrome and that the injury caused by Offerman ended his baseball career.
On July 29, 2014, Nathans won his suit, and Offerman was ordered to pay $940,000.

Dominican Republic Winter League incident
On 16 January 2010, Offerman once again engaged in an on-field assault when he struck an umpire while managing a Dominican Republic winter league game. Offerman, manager of the Licey Tigers, came onto the field during the third inning while losing a 6–0 game to the Cibao Giants, to protest ejection of his catcher for arguing balls and strikes and ended up arguing with first-base umpire D.J. Reyburn. He swung with a right hook at Reyburn, who then fell to the ground. Offerman was detained by stadium security, eventually being transported to the local police station to await the end of the game and Reyburn's decision whether to ask for charges to be pressed against him or not.

A day after the incident, the American crew that umpired the game resigned their positions with the Dominican Baseball League and left the country, reportedly due to threats and concerns about their own safety. Because of this incident Offerman received a lifetime ban from the Dominican Republic Winter League, a suspension that was eventually lifted in February 2013. Coincidentally, at the time he was suspended, Offerman was replacing Dave Jauss as Licey manager after Jauss was suspended himself for two years for bumping an umpire during a playoff game.

Personal life
He is the father of former WWE ring announcer and former reality television star JoJo Offerman.

See also
List of Major League Baseball annual triples leaders
List of Major League Baseball career stolen bases leaders

References

External links

Ducks' Offerman Arrested After Attack
Most overpaid baseball players
The 100 Greatest Royals of All-Time- #42 José Offerman

1968 births
Living people
Albuquerque Dukes players
American League All-Stars
Azucareros del Este players
Bakersfield Dodgers players
Baseball players at the 2007 Pan American Games
Boston Red Sox players
Bridgeport Bluefish players
Caribbean Series managers
Dominican Republic expatriate baseball players in Mexico
Dominican Republic expatriate baseball players in the United States
Dominican Republic people of Cocolo descent
Great Falls Dodgers players
Kansas City Royals players

Long Island Ducks players
Los Angeles Dodgers players
Major League Baseball first basemen
Major League Baseball players from the Dominican Republic
Major League Baseball second basemen
Major League Baseball shortstops
Mexican League baseball first basemen
Mexican League baseball managers
Minnesota Twins players
Minor league baseball managers
National League All-Stars
New York Mets players
Norfolk Tides players
Pacific Coast League MVP award winners
Sportspeople from San Pedro de Macorís
Philadelphia Phillies players
Rojos del Águila de Veracruz players
San Antonio Missions players
Seattle Mariners players
Tigres del Licey players
Vero Beach Dodgers players
Violence in sports
Pan American Games competitors for the Dominican Republic